Symphionema is a genus of two species of small shrubs in the family Proteaceae. Both species are endemic to New South Wales in Australia. 

Species
Symphionema montanum R.Br.
Symphionema paludosum R.Br.

References

External links

 
Flora of New South Wales
Proteaceae genera
Proteales of Australia
Endemic flora of Australia